I. tinctoria may refer to:
 Indigofera tinctoria, the true indigo, a plant species
 Isatis tinctoria, the woad, a flowering plant species

See also
 Tinctoria